Udomdej Sitabutr (born 15 August 1955) is a Thai military officer. He served as Commander-in-Chief of the Royal Thai Army from 2014 to 2015.

Education 
Udomdej studied at Saint Gabriel's College, an all-boys school. He then decided to go into a military career and proceeded to study at Armed Forces Academies Preparatory School (Class 14) and Chulachomklao Royal Military Academy (Class 25). Once finished in cadet school, he studied at Command and General Staff College (Class 65) and National Defence College (Class 57).

Career 
Sitabutr succeeded Prayuth Chan-ocha, who in May 2014, had seized power in a coup d'état. 

He concurrently served as Secretary-General of the junta, the National Council for Peace and Order. During his tenure he was implicated in the Rajabhakti Park scandal, having overseen its construction as Chairman of the Rajabhakti Foundation.

Udomdej retired in 2015 and was succeeded by Theerachai Nakvanich, with whom he had had a long-running feud.

Early life 
He is the youngest of six children. One of his older siblings, Paisarn Sitabutr, is himself a retired Air Chief Marshal in the Royal Thai Air Force and a member of the National Legislative Assembly.

Honours 
Udomdej received the following royal decorations in the Honours System of Thailand:
 2014 -  Knight Grand Cordon of the Most Exalted Order of the White Elephant 
 2011 -  Knight Grand Cordon of the Most Noble  Order of the Crown of Thailand 
 1990 -  Member of the Rama Mala Medal of the Honourable Order of Rama 
 1986 -  Freemen Safeguarding Medal (Second Class, First Category)
 1991 -  Border Service Medal
 1998 -  Chakra Mala Medal

References

Udomdej Sitabutr
Udomdej Sitabutr
Living people
1955 births
Udomdej Sitabutr
Udomdej Sitabutr
Udomdej Sitabutr